Reinhard Höppner (2 December 1948 – 9 June 2014) was a German politician (SPD) and writer.

Höppner held a Dr. rer. nat. in mathematics.

In 1990, in the first (and last) free election in the assembly's history, he was elected a member of the East German People's Chamber (Volkskammer), becoming the assembly's vice president.

He became the 4th Minister President of Saxony-Anhalt in July 1994 when, his SPD (party) having failed to secure an outright majority, entered into a minority governing coalition with the Green party.   This was controversial at the time because most had expected that the SPD, if denied an overall majority, would govern in coalition with the PDS, successor to the old East German ruling party:  together the SPD and PDS would have had an overall majority.   The so-called Magdeburg model for a minority SPD/Green coalition that excluded the PDS but nevertheless was tolerated (not voted down) by them was subsequently followed in other regional assemblies.  Höppner remained in office until 16 May 2002, when he was succeeded by Wolfgang Böhmer.

References

1948 births
People from Haldensleben
Members of the 10th Volkskammer
Members of the Landtag of Saxony-Anhalt
Social Democratic Party of Germany politicians
German Protestants
Knights Commander of the Order of Merit of the Federal Republic of Germany
2014 deaths
Ministers-President of Saxony-Anhalt